Emmanuel Arnold Okwi (born 25 December 1992) is a Ugandan professional footballer who plays as a left winger for Egyptian Premier League club Al Ittihad Alexandria Club and the Uganda national team.

Club career
Okwi played for Uganda Super League club SC Villa before joining Tanzanian team Simba S.C. for US$40,000.

In January 2013, Tunisian team Étoile Sportive du Sahel signed Okwi for a Tanzania record transfer fee of US$300,000. The team, however, failed to pay the fee to Simba S.C. He was then cleared by FIFA's Player Status Committee in December 2013 to return to SC Villa although the clearance was changed two months later so he could play for Young Africans S.C., despite Simba S.C.'s protests.

Okwi rejoined Simba S.C. in August 2014 under a six-month contract, explaining that Young Africans S.C. had terminated his contract by failing to pay the US$50,000 owed to him. Okwi refused to play the last five games of the 2013–14 season for Young Africans because of the payment controversy. Young Africans vigorously protested the transfer to Simba S.C. and claimed that the contract was still in effect. The Tanzania Football Federation rejected that claim in September 2014.

In July 2015, SønderjyskE Fodbold signed Okwi on a five-year contract, with the consent of Simba S.C., that would last until 2020. In January 2017, Okwi and agreed to terminate the contract. He scored two goals in six appearances.

Upon his return from Denmark Okwi re-joined former club SC Villa signing a six-month contract. He scored 10 goals in 13 Uganda Premier League matches.

In June 2017, Okwi signed with Simba S.C. for the third time in his career having agreed a two-year contract.

In July 2019, after impressing at the 2019 Africa Cup of Nations, Okwi joined Egyptian Premier League club Al Ittihad on a two-year contract.

International career
Okwi first represented Uganda at senior level in 2009.  He was the second top scorer at the 2010 CECAFA Cup, scoring a four goals in five matches. The following year at the 2011 CECAFA Cup, he scored five goals and was joint top scorer alongside Rwanda's Meddie Kagere and their captain Olivier Karekezi.

Personal life
Okwi grew up idolizing Thierry Henry and is a fan of Arsenal F.C. Okwi was born into a Roman Catholic family, but at a young age, his mother became a Born Again Christian and raised her children in her faith. Okwi married his longtime girlfriend Florence Nakalegga with whom they have one child. Okwi played football as a boy while at St. Henry's College Kitovu.

Career statistics

International

Scores and results list Uganda's goal tally first, score column indicates score after each Okwi goal.

References

External links
 

1992 births
Living people
Sportspeople from Kampala
Ugandan footballers
Uganda international footballers
Ugandan expatriate footballers
Association football wingers
Tunisian Ligue Professionnelle 1 players
Danish Superliga players
Egyptian Premier League players
SC Villa players
Étoile Sportive du Sahel players
SønderjyskE Fodbold players
Simba S.C. players
Young Africans S.C. players
Al Ittihad Alexandria Club players
Ugandan Christians
Former Roman Catholics
2019 Africa Cup of Nations players
Expatriate footballers in Tanzania
Expatriate footballers in Tunisia
Expatriate men's footballers in Denmark
Expatriate footballers in Egypt
Ugandan expatriate sportspeople in Tanzania
Ugandan expatriate sportspeople in Tunisia
Ugandan expatriate sportspeople in Denmark
Ugandan expatriate sportspeople in Egypt
Tanzanian Premier League players